June Lang (born Winifred June Vlasek, May 5, 1917 – May 16, 2005) was an American film actress.

Early life
Born Winifred June Vlasek in Minneapolis, Minnesota, she was the daughter of Edith and Clarence Vlasek, After the family moved to Los Angeles, Lang trained at a school of dance and performed in revues in theaters in Los Angeles. She graduated from Beverly Hills High School.

Career
 At age 16, Lang was a dancer at a vaudeville theater in Los Angeles when she left that job to seek work at the  Fox Film studio. The company had her teeth straightened and changed her name from Vlasek to Lang. 

Lang made her film debut in 1931, with much of her early work coming in minor roles in musical and dramatic films. She gradually securing second lead roles in mostly B movies for 20th Century Fox. She played her debut feature film role in Young Sinners.

Noted for her fragile and demure appearance, she was usually cast as the little sister or the heroine's best friend in light comedies and adventure films. 

Early in Lang's career, she was a blonde when she worked for Fox Film, averaging "about one good role a year" and spending more time posing for publicity photographs while wearing a bathing suit. Her last film under her contract was Bonnie Scotland (1935), for which Fox loaned her to Hal Roach Studios. Fox did not renew her contract, and during her time of "brief retirement" she changed her hair color to chestnut. An encounter with producer Darryl F. Zanuck at the Trocadero night club led to her being cast as the romantic lead in Captain January (1936) for the new 20th Century Fox. Within 12 weeks she had five significant roles in films.

She soon graduated to leading roles, most notably in Bonnie Scotland (with Laurel and Hardy, 1935), in The Road to Glory (with Fredric March, Warner Baxter and Lionel Barrymore—written in part by William Faulkner—1936), and as Joyce Williams in Wee Willie Winkie (directed by John Ford, with Shirley Temple, Cesar Romero, and Victor McLaglen, 1937).

Personal life
Lang first married her Hollywood agent, Victor Orsatti, on May 29, 1937, but they divorced on August 5, 1937. Her reputation as a wholesome leading lady was somewhat tarnished when she married Johnny Roselli, a Chicago connected mobster who helped control Hollywood movie unions, on April 1, 1939. Lang later said she had no idea that Rosselli was a mobster. Lang and Rosselli divorced in March, 1943.  Fox Studios had released Lang from her contract one year before she was married to Rosselli. She was released from contract in 1938, because against Fox studio orders, she left the United Kingdom, after she was cast in So This Is London, which was filmed at Pinewood Studios in London, Fox's U.K. studio.. Lang and her mother left London because they feared an impending war in Europe. Three years after marrying him, Lang divorced Rosselli, but she later found it more difficult to secure consistent film work. Lang married John Morgan in 1946 (they divorced in 1952), with whom she had a daughter.

Lang semi retired from acting in 1947, after struggling as a free lancer to re-establish her film career for several years. Lang occasionally appeared in minor roles on television.

Lang died in 2005 in Valley Village, California. She is buried in Forest Lawn Cemetery in Los Angeles.

Partial filmography

Young Sinners (1931) - Minor Role (uncredited)
The Miracle Woman (1931) - Church Choir Singer (uncredited)
She Wanted a Millionaire (1932) - Beauty Contest Contestant (uncredited)
Chandu the Magician (1932) - Betty Lou Regent
I Loved You Wednesday (1933) - Ballet Dancer
The Man Who Dared (1933) - Barbara Novak
Now I'll Tell (1934) - Girl at Beach (uncredited)
She Learned About Sailors (1934) - Girl at Dance Hall (uncredited)
Love Time (1934) - Minor Role (uncredited)
Music in the Air (1934) - Sieglinde Lessing
George White's 1935 Scandals (1935) - Chorine (uncredited)
Bonnie Scotland (1935) - Lorna MacLaurel
The Country Doctor (1936) - Mary MacKenzie
Every Saturday Night (1936) - Bonnie Evers
Captain January (1936) - Mary Marshall
The Road to Glory (1936) - Monique La Coste
White Hunter (1936) - Toni Varek
Nancy Steele Is Missing! (1937) - Sheila O'Neill - aka Nancy Steele
Wee Willie Winkie (1937) - Joyce Williams
Ali Baba Goes to Town (1937) - Princess Miriam / June Lang
International Settlement (1938) - Joyce Parker
One Wild Night (1938) - Gale Gibson aka Jennifer Jewel
Meet the Girls (1938) - Judy Davis
Zenobia (1939) - Virginia
Forged Passport (1939) - Rosa
For Love or Money (1939) - Susan Bannister
Captain Fury (1939) - Jeanette Dupre
Inside Information (1939) - Kathleen Burke
Convicted Woman (1940) - Georgia Mason aka The Duchess
Isle of Destiny (1940) - Virginia Allerton
Redhead (1941) - Dale Carter
The Deadly Game (1941) - Christine Reisner
Too Many Women (1942) - Gwenny Miller
Footlight Serenade (1942) - June
The City of Silent Men (1942) - Helen Hendricks
Stage Door Canteen (1943) - Herself (Cameo)
Flesh and Fantasy (1943) - Angela (uncredited)
Up in Arms (1944) - Goldwyn Girl (uncredited)
Three of a Kind (1944) - Delores O'Toole
Lighthouse (1947) - Connie Armitage

References

 Quinlan, David. Quinlan's Film Stars. Batsford Books, 1996 edition.

External links

 
 
 Photographs of June Lang

American film actresses
1917 births
2005 deaths
20th-century American actresses
Burials at Forest Lawn Memorial Park (Hollywood Hills)
Actresses from Minneapolis
21st-century American women